Świat według Kiepskich (The World According to the Kiepskis, "kiepski" could be roughly translated to the English term poor or shoddy) is a Polish television sitcom that premiered on 16 March 1999 on Polsat. The show follows the life of a dysfunctional Polish family from Wrocław. Most episodes are centered on Ferdynand Kiepski, the family's patriarch, who schemes to improve his financial or life situation, but in most cases ultimately fails. The series is a parody of stereotypical lives of Polish families in a style similar to the US series Married... with Children, released in Poland as Świat według Bundych (The World According to the Bundys).

In June 2022, Polsat announced the end of production of the show.

Main characters

The Kiepski family
Ferdynand Kiepski (Andrzej Grabowski), also called "Ferdek": Head of the family, almost continuously unemployed (since 13 December 1981, the day when martial law was declared in Poland) father of two, who has a penchant for canned beer and trying to prove that he is an unappreciated genius. His character is similar to that of Homer Simpson, as well as Peggy Bundy, who enjoys the finer things in life yet refuses to work for them. Ferdynand comes up with ridiculous get-rich-quick schemes that, due to his own faults and comic coincidences, usually fail (when they succeed they are usually a part of a self-contained episode, which is never referenced again). Addicted to alcohol and cigarettes. His favorite pastimes are drinking "Mocny Full" ("Strong Full") beer and watching television. He inherited his name after his German grandfather, Ferdinand Urlich Doppeldeke. Ferdynand is shown in later seasons as a hypocritical zealous Roman Catholic, eager to act as a respectable patriarch of his family and to criticize any sins committed by others, but blind to his own alcoholism, laziness, xenophobia, and toxic personality. He made his debut in the first episode.
Halina Kiepska (Marzena Kipiel-Sztuka): Ferdek's wife, who works at a nearby hospital as a nurse. In early episodes she was a cleaning lady at a hospital, but one day Ferdek had his wish granted through a miracle, and his wife got a better job. Every day she has to solve problems created by other members of the family. Addicted to cigarettes. She's the one strong-arming Ferdynand to look for a job, usually using a line "A w pośredniaku byłeś?" ("Did you go to Job Centre today?"). In a self-contained episode 151 she turned out to be intersex. She also debuted in the first episode.
Rozalia Kiepska (commonly known as "Babka" - "Gran") (Krystyna Feldman): Ferdynand’s mother-in-law, her last name is also Kiepski; she sometimes says that her name is Rozalia Małolepsza ('Not-much-better'). She was a senile citizen who sometimes is unable to make a distinction between real and imaginary world. Her pension was a key component of the family’s budget. Ferdynand constantly tried to con her out of money in order to buy more beer for himself. She loved "Koziołek Matołek", a Polish cartoon from the 1960s, and also the religious radio station Radio Maryja. One time, along with her friends, she became a member of a street gang, robbing banks and knitting scarves. Feldman resigned from this role two years before her death in 2007, after which Rozalia has been established as dead. Rozalia debuted in the first episode.
Waldemar Kiepski (nicknamed "Cyc" - "Tit") (Bartosz Żukowski): the adult son of Ferdynand and Halina. Like his father he is unemployed. In the early episodes his life revolved around bodybuilding or drinking beer with his father, as well as avoiding books and studying. Walduś had problems with finishing elementary school, but after many attempts he succeeded. He often helps his father with his schemes. Walduś ends up leaving for the United States to sell hot dogs with his uncle Staszek in Texas, but he comes back in the 13th season and gets married with Jolanta Kopeć. After the marriage, his character is changed to a spineless man with anger issues, dominated by his wife. Although he is treated by Jolanta as little more than a machine for making money, he genuely loves his wife, much to the dismay of Ferdynand. He debuted in the first episode.
Mariola Kiepska (Barbara Mularczyk): Waldek’s younger sister. In the first several seasons she is a typical teenager and likes to spend time outside the house - this usually involves going somewhere with her boyfriend Łysy ('Bald'). Her personality doesn't change throughout seasons, even though in the most recent seasons she is in her late twenties. She has been under her parents' pressure to get married, for a long time with no success, though she finally marries a man called Mikołaj Kopernik, being persuaded by her sister-in-law that a woman who has never married sounds as if she wasn't considered attractive enough. She got married only because she decided that being called a divorcée will sound better than being an old maiden. She debuted in the first episode - Umarł odbiornik, niech żyje odbiornik! (TV is dead, long live the TV!)
Jolanta Kiepska (nicknamed "Jolasia" and "Pupcia") (Anna Ilczuk): Waldemar's wife. A narcissist and the dominant person in the marriage, she is cunning, opportunistic and extremely ruthless, demeaning her husband whenever possible, using emotional manipulation on her mother-in-law Halina, and stealing somewhat valuable items and food from the home of her parents-in-law whenever she can. She frequently talks in verse and fashions extravagant hairstyles and vibrant hair colors.
Mikołaj Kopernik (Andrzej Kłak): the husband of Mariola, a timid, well-read and eccentric young man who used to be Mariola's silent admirer, with no response from Mariola herself until the marriage arranged by her parents. He makes his first appearance in the 517th episode.

Others
Marian Paździoch (Ryszard Kotys): a neighbour of the Kiepski family who owns several unsuccessful businesses. His day job is selling lingerie at a bazaar. He is a constant rival to Ferdynand and both are often thorns in each other's sides. He is usually called 'menda' (cunt). Many of the stories of his past are contradictory. In one episode he stated his father is German and in another, that his mother wanted him to be a priest (he keeps lying to his mother and saying that he is one). Marian's full name is Marian Janusz Heinrich Gottlieb Paździoch von Biberstein. Also, Paździoch once hinted that he had been a member of the ZOMO unit, saying that he had been using a baton on the streets of Wroclaw. In episode 363 - Uczeń czarnoksiężnika (The Sorcerer's Apprentice) he turns out to be an ancient evil sorcerer, soon defeated by Ferdek and Walduś and turned into a roll of toilet paper, which was never referenced again. He died in several episodes, in one he has become a Christian missionary to christianise an alien race, all of which also haven't been referenced again. In several non-connected episodes he turns out to be a trans woman or a gay man. He debuted in the first episode.
Arnold Boczek (Arnold Bacon) (Dariusz Gnatowski): another neighbour, an employee of a slaughterhouse; he is obese and not very clever. The past of Arnold Boczek is contradictory; while in most episodes it is stated that he originates from a village near Elbląg, in one episode he is presented as a transgender man born in Italy. He enjoys eating fatty meat accompanied with vodka. He is very naive and often becomes a victim of Paździoch's business plans. He's a keen lover of Mongolian ballet. In the first two episodes Boczek appeared to live with his brother, who has never been seen or mentioned again, however other relatives of Boczek appeared during the show. Also, in the first two episodes he appeared in, Boczek was portrayed as aggressive and tough but in later episodes he became a very sympathetic and childish person. A frequently repeated gag is Boczek using the public toilet on the floor of Kiepskis and Paździochs, much to their irritation. He debuted in the second episode - Wiara czyni cuda (Faith performs miracles).
Helena Paździoch née Meisner (Renata Pałys): Marian's wife. She is greedy, despotic, ruthless and very violent. She doesn't love her husband. She debuted in first episode - Umarł odbiornik, niech żyje odbiornik! (TV is dead, long live the TV!)
Listonosz Edzio (Eddie the Mailman) (Bohdan Smoleń): delivers mail to the Kiepski’s home. Always speaks in verse, and describes himself as a 'poet' and a philosopher. He is sometimes called "Edzio-Pedzio", by Ferdynand (Pedzio is an abbreviation of the Polish slur "pedał", which translates to faggot). He was debuted in first episode, but was written as a cameo role due to the actor's failing health, and ultimately written off due to Smoleń's death in 2016.
Prezes Andrzej Kozłowski (Andrzej Gałła): a corrupt politician in charge of the Kiepski's neighborhood. Considers himself a friend of Ferdek, even though the people of the neighborhood generally dislike him for his incompetence and for showing off his considerable wealth. He has a wife nicknamed Foka (Seal), played by Joanna Kurowska, and a political arch-nemesis Talarek, played by Krzysztof Dracz.
Malinowska (Zofia Czerwińska): the owner of the local shop U Stasia named after her now deceased husband Stanisław (also Krzysztof Dracz). An assertive woman, aware of the large debt that Ferdynand and Badura own her due to never having any money.
Badura (Lech Dyblik): a homeless alcoholic living in a scrap-heap. A friend of Ferdynand (though the latter often insults him while Badura isn't present), a scrap hunter, a philosopher and a guitarist with an addiction to cheap wine. In one self-contained episode he was revealed to be an angel.
Tadeusz Kopciński (Jerzy Cnota): a lonely retired man in his seventies, a nosey and assertive man, posing as a pious and devout Catholic despite the fact that during the rule of socialists he used to be an ardent follower of the Communist Party. 
Janusz Marian Paździoch da Silva Bolsonaro Haczapui (Sławomir Szczęśniak): the illegitimate adult son of Marian Paździoch and of an unnamed Roma woman. He lived in Paraguay until his arrival to Poland, where he reunited with his father. Initially rejected by Helena Paździoch, he is accepted by her as a son when he proves that he is very wealthy. He lives with Marian and Helena in their apartment. He first appeared in the 541st episode.
Ziemowit / Ziomek (Maciej Gołębiowski): a cousin from the countryside, son of Ferdek's brother Staszek. He was living with the Kiepskis for a while, fulfilling the role of Waldemar when the actor who played as Waldemar had a break from the series. 
Wujek Władek (Uncle Władek): Ferdek's uncle from the countryside, played by different actors, mostly by Marek Pyś, but also by Roman Kłosowski. He is canonically dead, Ferdynand once used a licensed herbalist's help to visit Władek in the afterlife.
Borysek (Kazimierz Ostrowicz): an old man who lives in the Kiepski's block of flats, who used to be a baker. He is a strict Catholic while also being a sexaholic. He debuted in the second episode. A discontinued character.
Paulinka (Zuzanna Helska): an old rude woman that lives in the Kiepski's block of flats. Babka's friend, a very strict Catholic. She also debuted in the second episode. A discontinued character.
Stanisław Pączek (Michał Grudziński): local Catholic priest with a very harsh and judgemental personality. He dislikes Ferdek, Marian and Arnold for their sinful lives.

Reception 
Neatoramas Miss Cellania critiqued the show saying "You can tell by the picture that this production strayed a bit from the original formula instead of trying to clone the American sitcom."

See also
 Married... with Children

References

External links 
 

Polish television sitcoms
Surreal comedy television series
Polish satirical television shows
1990s satirical television series
1990s sitcoms
Weekday television series
Political satirical television series